Dabangg is a series of Indian Hindi-language action comedy films produced in common by Arbaaz Khan, starring Salman Khan as the titular cop Chulbul Pandey, Sonakshi Sinha as his love interest Rajjo Pandey, and Arbaaz Khan as Chulbul's step-brother Makhanchand "Makkhi" Pandey. The original work is 2010 film, named Dabangg was directed by Abhinav Kashyap and produced by Dhilin Mehta.

Overview

Dabangg (2010)

A corrupt police officer, Chulbul Pandey (Salman Khan), faces challenges from his family, gangsters and politicians.

Dabangg 2 (2012)

Chulbul Pandey invites a fresh trouble when he kills the brother of a notorious politician and the former swears to wreak havoc in his life.

Dabangg 3 (2019)

Chulbul Pandey encounters an enemy from his past, and his origin story as the fearless cop unfolds.

Animated series 
An animated series based on the film franchise, also titled Dabangg,
premiered on May 31, 2021 as the title Dabangg Animated TV Series on Cartoon Network which was also produced by the same company and Cosmos Maya with CN India. It also aired on Pogo TV in February 2022.

Films

Dabangg

The first installment of the series centers on the fictional incidents. Chulbul Pandey is a cop who has his own way of dealing with corruption. His detractor Cheddi Singh manages to create a rift between Chulbul and his step-brother and uses it to his advantage. Dabangg was released on 10 September 2010, and gained positive reviews. Mathures Paul of The Statesman gave the film 3.5 stars and commented that "Dabangg aligns itself with viewers frustrated by the nonexistence of uncomplicated heroism on screen". It earned  ₹219 crore worldwide against a budget of ₹42 crore.

Dabangg 2

After the success of Dabangg Arbaaz and Salman reunited once again for sequel. The second installment in this series, the plot focused on Chulbul Pandey, a wayward policeman, who kills the brother of a crooked politician. In retribution, the politician sends his henchmen to attack Chulbul's wife which leaves Chulbul infuriated. Dabangg 2 was released in 3500 screens in India and 450 screens overseas on 21 December 2012. It had the highest screen count for any film in India and worldwide, surpassing that of Ek Tha Tiger. It received mixed reviews from critics. Taran Adarsh of Bollywood Hungama gave the film 4 out of 5 stars and said "Dabangg 2 has Salman Khan, Salman Khan and Salman Khan plus entertainment, entertainment and entertainment in large doses". The film was declared a blockbuster by Box Office India after its first week. Dabangg 2 grossed around $11.75 million in its total lifetime.

Dabangg 3

A prequel, Dabangg 3, was commissioned after the success of the previous film and was directed by Prabhu Deva, with both Salman and Sonakshi reprising their roles and Saiee Manjrekar in a cameo role. The film focused on ASP Chulbul Pandey who enjoys an ideal family life while catching criminals in his own bombastic way. However, an enemy from his past returns and threatens to destroy everything he has worked for. The film was theatrically released worldwide on 20 December 2019, on the Pre-Christmas weekend, in Hindi, and dubbed Tamil, Telugu and Kannada languages to positive reviews from both critics and audience. Dabangg 3 opening day domestic collection was 24.50 crore. , with a gross of est. 161 crore in India and 56.99 crore overseas, the film has a worldwide gross collection of est. 325 crore and has become the tenth highest grossing Bollywood film of 2019. It was declared super-hit at box-office.

Future films

After success of the third film, the makers have stated that they will continue the franchise and take it to the fourth and final installment in this series. The film is produced by Arbaaz Khan.

Recurring cast and characters 
This table lists the main characters who appear in the Dabangg Franchise.
A dark grey cell indicates the character was not in the film.

Additional crew and production details

Release and revenue

Reception

Critical reception

Awards

Dabangg received accolades in major film award functions in India. Among them, it won a National Film Award for the Best Popular Film Providing Wholesome Entertainment. It was given six awards at the 56th Filmfare Awards, including one for Best Film, seven Screen Awards, nine Zee Cine Awards and ten IIFA Awards. Dabangg 2 also received several awards.

Influence 
Many other film characters are inspired by the character Chulbul Pandey.

Remakes
 Osthe (Tamil remake of Dabangg)
 Gabbar Singh (Telugu adaption of Dabangg)

Notes

References

External links
 
 
 
 

 
 
 
 

 Dabbang 3 at Filmybeat2

2010s Hindi-language films
Indian film series
Action film series
Trilogies
Films adapted into television shows